The Marq*E Entertainment Center is an entertainment complex in Houston, Texas at the Interstate 10 - Interstate 610 western junction. It is host to 25 different entertainment venues, including Edward's Marq*E Imax.  Levcor, Inc, a real estate development and management firm based in Houston, Texas, purchased the asset in 2014.

Location 
The Marq*E is located along the Interstate 10 in Texas and is 6 miles from Houston's central business district, 3 miles from The Galleria and 6.5 miles east of the Houston Energy Corridor.

The neighborhoods surrounding the entertainment center include Memorial Villages, Spring Branch, Greater Heights, and the Garden Oaks/Oak Forest regions.

History 
The entertainment center was first opened in 2003 by a private owner and was later sold by Magic Johnson (in conjunction with Fidelis Realty) to Levcor, Inc.

In 2014, the 35-acre property was purchased by a group known as Levcor, Inc in 2014, with plans for development and renovation. Previous owners included a partnership between California real-estate group, Canyon-Johnson Urban Funds and Fidelis Realty Advisors.

Venues 
The Marq*E Entertainment Center is home to the following venues: 
 Art Class & Wine Glass
 Bank of America
 Big City Wings
 Chick-Fil-A
 Class 502 Rolling Ice Cream
 Dave & Buster's
 Dolce & Cafe
 Edward's Cinema
 Eight One
 Four Seasons Massage
 Hugh O'Connors
 Improv
 LA Fitness
 Jersey Mike's Subs
 Maine-ly Sandwiches
 Management Office
 Mystery Room Houston
 NW Dental
 Panda Express
 Paris's Nails and Spa
 Pump It Up
 Red Robin
 Rocket Fizz
 Russo's New York Pizzeria
 Subway
 T-Mobile
 Warehouse 72

Former outlets 
 A&W
 Café Adobe
 Claire's
 Cold Stone Creamery
 Creative Smiles Family Dentistry
 Cricket Wireless
 Cyber Coliseum
 Drink Houston Club
 EB Games
 Games Workshop
 Hot Topic
 Jillian's Eat-Drink-Plan
 Kpop Sushi & Seafood Buffet
 Le Duc Pastries and Coffee House
 LoCal's Healthy Joint
 Mattress Firm
 Massage Heights
 Putting Edge
 Quizno's Sub Shop
 Schlotzky's
 Security Office
 Silver Smith Galleries
 Soccer Hub 
 Todai Sushi & Seafood Buffet
 Wings 'N' More Restaurant

References

See also

Shopping malls in Houston